Litoral Province may refer to:
 Litoral Province (Equatorial Guinea)
 Litoral Province (Bolivia)

See also 
 Littoral Province (Cameroon)
 Littoral (disambiguation)
 Coastal Province

Province name disambiguation pages